The 2001 World Figure Skating Championships were held at the GM Place in Vancouver, British Columbia, Canada from March 17 to 25. Medals were awarded in the disciplines of men's singles, ladies' singles, pair skating, and ice dancing.

This event was the primary means of deciding the number of entries each country would have to the 2002 Olympics.

Medal table

Competition notes
Due to the large number of participants, the men's and ladies' qualifying groups were split into groups A and B. The ice dancers were also split into two groups for the compulsory dances, which were the same for both groups. Group B skated both compulsory dances, followed immediately by Group A skating both compulsory dances.

The national anthem of Russia was played for the first time at a World Figure Skating Championships.

Results

Men

Referee:
 Marina Sanaya 

Assistant Referee:
 Ronald T. Pfenning 

Judges:
 Alexander Pentchev 
 Nicolae Bellu 
 Susan Lynch 
 Peter Moser 
 Matjaz Kruzec 
 Fabio Bianchetti 
 Deborah Islam 
 Mieko Fujimori 
 Felicitas Babusikova 

Substitute judge:
 Marie-Reine Le Gougne

Ladies

Referee:
 John Greenwood 

Assistant Referee:
 Britta Lindgren 

Judges:
 Zoya Yordanova 
 Igor Prokop 
 Florin Gafencu 
 Joseph L. Inman 
 Jiasheng Yang 
 Hermi Ottemann 
 Davorin Orban 
 Lone Villefrance 
 Hideo Sugita 

Substitute judge:
 Judit Fьrst-Tombor

Pairs

Referee:
 Walburga Grimm 

Assistant Referee:
 Lucy J. Brennan 

Judges:
 Volker Waldeck 
 Jarmila Portova 
 Vladislav Petukhov 
 Alain Miquel 
 Evgenia Bogdanova 
 Benoit Lavoie 
 Paolo Pizzocari 
 Ubavka Novakovic-Kytinoy 
 Roger Glenn 

Substitute judge:
 Tatiana Danilenko

Ice dancing

Referee:
 Courtney Jones 

Assistant Referee:
 Ann Shaw 

Judges:
 Christine Hurth 
 Alla Shekhovtseva 
 Ulf Denzer 
 Walter Zuccaro 
 Istvan Sugar 
 Yuri Balkov 
 Verena Diener 
 Hilary Selby 
 Irina Nechkina 

Substitute judge:
 Linda K. Leaver

External links
 2001 World Figure Skating Championships 

World Figure Skating Championships
World Figure Skating Championships
World Figure Skating Championships
International figure skating competitions hosted by Canada
2001 in Canadian sports
2001 in British Columbia
March 2001 sports events in Canada
Sports competitions in Vancouver
2000s in Vancouver